Bastob Roy is an Indian former football player and is the current assistant coach of ATK Mohun Bagan FC. During his playing days, Roy played for Mohun Bagan, Mohammedan, Tollygunge Agragami, and George Telegraph.

Coaching career
On 28 July 2015 it was announced that Roy would become the assistant coach of Indian Super League side Atlético de Kolkata. As well as the assistant coach, Roy was also made the head coach of the side's under-23 side that would play in the Calcutta Football League Division Three. On 28 October 2016, after the suspension of Kolkata's head coach, José Francisco Molina, Roy was confirmed to take charge of the side for their match against NorthEast United. Despite going down 1–0, Atlético de Kolkata came back to win 2–1 and move to first place in the ISL regular season table.

References

Year of birth missing (living people)
Living people
Footballers from West Bengal
Mohun Bagan AC players
Mohammedan SC (Kolkata) players
Tollygunge Agragami FC players
Indian footballers
Indian football managers
ATK (football club) head coaches
Indian Super League head coaches
Association footballers not categorized by position
East Bengal Club managers
Association football coaches